Power Plus Pro is a piece of financial software produced by Reuters Group in the form of an add-in for Microsoft Office Excel. A real-time data engine, it pushes new data into Excel when it receives notification of updates from a Reuters TIBCO bus or from Thomson Reuters' RMDS. This commonly involves live market data, such as stock prices, from a financial exchange. Using the addin, Excel can also  contribute information to the TIBCO bus or to RMDS; such information then becomes available to other permissioned users using the addin on another computer or using Reuters 3000 Xtra stand-alone software. Power Plus Pro also has features which allow retrieval of historical market data.

A typical Excel formula call might read: =RtGet("IDN_SELECTFEED","AAPL","LAST").

Competitors include; Arcontech's Excelerator , MDX Technology's Connect, Vistasource's RTW, and the addin associated with the Bloomberg Terminal (Bloomberg L.P.'s equivalent of Reuters 3000 Xtra). Arcontech Excelerator, MDXT Connect and Vistasource RTW,  provide real-time data engines and Excel add-ins and will generally source data from Bloomberg, Reuters and/or other market data sources. Due to the widespread use of Reuters Power Plus Pro, some of the competitors provide conversion utilities to convert from Power Plus Pro functions to their own equivalents (e.g., Arcontech Excelerator) and/or emulation functionality so that Power Plus Pro functions can be used directly without modifications to spreadsheets (e.g., Arcontech Excelerator, MDXT Connect).

Power Plus Pro has been succeeded by Thomson Reuters' Eikon Excel which can convert Power Plus Pro spreadsheets to use new functions.

References

Financial software